The Bob McLean Show was a Canadian talk show television series which aired on CBC Television from 1975 to 1981.

Premise
CBC Television created this series in 1975 to replace Elwood Glover's Luncheon Date whose host had left the network for another Toronto-based broadcaster. Bob McLean hosted this new talk show from the lower floor of the Cumberland Terrace, a small downtown Toronto shopping centre at Yonge and Bloor.

From the second season, the series featured an increasing proportion of Canadian guests and subjects. In 1979, the series travelled from its normal Toronto studio with episodes produced in various Canadian cities such as Halifax, Ottawa and Vancouver.

The Royal Canadian Air Farce's Roger Abbott and Don Ferguson were frequently seen on the series as were comedians Howie Mandel and Monica Parker. Jimmy Dale was the series musical director.

Scheduling
This series was broadcast as follows (times in Eastern), normally an hour duration except as noted:

Highlights from the series were compiled as The Best of Bob McLean which was broadcast on Saturdays in 1976 and 1977 between regular television seasons.

External links
 
 The Bob McLean Show at CBC Digital Archives
 

CBC Television original programming
Television shows filmed in Toronto
1975 Canadian television series debuts
1981 Canadian television series endings
1970s Canadian television talk shows
1980s Canadian television talk shows